SpotPass and StreetPass are communication systems first introduced in the Nintendo 3DS. SpotPass was later incorporated into the Nintendo 2DS, models of the New 3DS and New 2DS, and Wii U game consoles. SpotPass delivers content from the Internet to the consoles, and StreetPass uses local Wi-Fi functionality to exchange data between 3DS, 2DS, and Wii U systems.

SpotPass 
SpotPass is a Nintendo 3DS and Wii U "always on" online background connectivity system, similarly to how predecessor WiiConnect24 originally functioned with Wii, which can automatically seek and connect to wireless network nodes such as Wi-Fi hotspots, sending and downloading information in the background while in sleep mode or while playing a game or running an application. It can be customized to fit the user's preferences, including opting out of it altogether for selected software. One application was being considered to use this functionality to "automatically acquire magazine and newspaper articles", similar to networked e-book reader applications.

Nintendo 3DS 
Full WiFi connectivity requires the Nintendo 3DS to be properly connected to a Wi-Fi connection via its settings, but SpotPass can be obtained automatically and passively. When new data is received from SpotPass and the system is in sleep mode, the notification LED of the system will turn blue and will remain blue until the system is taken out of sleep mode. When SpotPass data is received while the system is not in sleep mode, the notification LED will blink blue a few times before returning to being off. During the 2011 Game Developers Conference, Nintendo of America president Reggie Fils-Aimé announced a partnership with AT&T to provide access to AT&T hotspots via the Nintendo 3DS. Users can connect to these hotspots automatically and free of charge. SpotPass also makes uses of certified hotspots to access an application called Nintendo Zone. In the Nintendo Zone application, users can view game trailers, game screenshots, and information about current and upcoming Nintendo 3DS titles. After leaving the hotspot, although the app remains on their Nintendo 3DS system, the player becomes unable to access it.

Wii U 
Similar to Nintendo 3DS's more distinctly mobile SpotPass functionality, the SpotPass feature on Wii U allows the system to automatically download available content via the Internet in the background, while the system is in use or in sleep mode.  When the system is transmitting while in sleep mode, the system light will turn orange. Content that can be downloaded via SpotPass includes full game and application downloads, firmware updates, patches, and specific in-game content. Content currently being downloaded can be viewed in the Download Manager, accessed via the Wii U's Home Menu.

StreetPass 

StreetPass is Nintendo 3DS functionality which allows passive communication between Nintendo 3DS systems held by users in close proximity, an example being the sharing of Mii avatars in the StreetPass Mii Plaza application, and other game data. Similar to SpotPass in the Nintendo 3DS, when new data is received from StreetPass and the system is in sleep mode, the notification LED of the system will turn green and will remain green until the system is taken out of sleep mode; when StreetPass data is received while the system is not in sleep mode, the notification LED will blink green a few times before returning to being off.

StreetPass allows users to exchange software content from select games played on their system, regardless of what software is currently in the console. StreetPass functionality must be activated for each piece of compatible software and can be disabled by parental controls. Currently shared content is stored in one of twelve "data slots" in the console. Using this data slot, Nintendo 3DS users can readily share and exchange content for multiple games at the same time, whenever they are connected. Using the console's background connectivity, a Nintendo 3DS in Sleep Mode can automatically discover other Nintendo 3DS systems within range, establish a connection, and exchange content for mutually played games, all transparently and without requiring any user input. For example, in Rhythm Heaven Megamix, if the user passes by someone with the same software, they will take on a figure-fighting duel challenge. Each game can only hold a certain number of StreetPass exchanges, requiring the player to check their game software before additional exchanges can be made (for example, StreetPass Mii Plaza can only hold ten visitors at a time).

Trademarks suggested that this functionality would be named "CrossPass", but on September 29, 2010, during the Nintendo World conference, the name of the Tag Mode service was confirmed to be StreetPass.

StreetPass Mii Plaza 

StreetPass Mii Plaza is a built-in application included with every Nintendo 3DS family device and the primary application for StreetPass interactivity. Here, players can set up their Mii to appear on other 3DS devices that it encounters via StreetPass. Up to ten Miis can be brought into the plaza at a time and taken into various mini-games. Two mini-games, Puzzle Swap and Find Mii / StreetPass Quest, are included as standard, whilst eleven additional games; Mii Force / StreetPass Squad, Flower Town / StreetPass Garden, Warrior's Way / StreetPass Battle, Monster Manor / StreetPass Mansion, Ultimate Angler, Battleground Z, Slot Car Rivals, Market Crashers, Feed Mii, Ninja Launcher, and Mii Trek can be purchased separately. All games allow players to use Play Coins in place of StreetPass Miis.

StreetPass Relay 
StreetPass Relay was announced during an analyst briefing at E3 2013, where Nintendo announced that it was creating thousands of new StreetPass Relay stations across the United States and Europe. Nintendo planned to turn over 29,000 Wi-Fi access points into relays in the US, while Europe would see approximately 30,000. With this network, Nintendo aimed to vastly improve the functionality of the 3DS and enable players to find more Miis in their StreetPass Mii Plaza. It was powered by Hbase, Puppet, fluentd, and Amazon Web Services cloud technologies.

StreetPass Relay points were located at Nintendo Zones all across the country. When a Nintendo 3DS user got near a StreetPass Relay point, it automatically forwarded his or her StreetPass data to Nintendo's servers which stored it temporarily to pass it on to the next Nintendo 3DS user to pass by the same relay point. The Nintendo servers kept track of each relay point by the MAC address of the node. StreetPass Relay points supported StreetPass data for various games each time a Nintendo 3DS user passes by. This meant the user could get StreetPass data for several games at once.

On March 28, 2018, StreetPass Relays worldwide were shut down, with the exception of the Nintendo store in New York City and Best Buy locations in Canada.

Notes

References 

Nintendo 3DS
Nintendo Network
Online video game services
Wii U